The Planetarium of Nantes is a planetarium located in Nantes, France. It was inaugurated in 1981.

Location 
The planetarium is located at 8 Rue des Acadiens in Butte Sainte-Anne. It is near the bank of the Loire, in the Square Moisan and the neighborhood Bellevue - Chantenay - Sainte-Anne.

Characteristics 
The planetarium can not be visited as a museum, it offers commented sessions of about an hour (as in the cinema but live). Each session, is scheduled in advanced and adapted to a certain type of public, according to the age or the level of knowledge.

Under a dome 8 meters (26 ft) in diameter, the planetarium can accommodate 59 spectators and accommodate about 60,000 visitors per year, school or the general public.

In the lobby, there are three large meteorites (36 kg or 79 lbs for the heaviest) that the public can touch, showcases exposing several fragments of various types of meteorites, models putting various robots in situation on the soil of Mars, Venus, the Moon, Titan (moon of Saturn) and on a comet, planetary globes, rockets, the International Space Station, probes like Juno (around Jupiter) or the Hubble Space Telescope and James Webb Space Telescope, and other rovers.

The planetarium is equipped with a mobile planetarium (an inflatable structure 5 to 6 meters in diameter and 3 meters high) designed for the introduction to astronomy for use in schools.

The Planetarium of Nantes also weaves a network among the local actors like the Laboratory of planetology of the University of Nantes, the Museum of natural history, the science and environment pole Sequoia, the Society of Astronomy of Nantes, the association "Meridienne" , and many others, all working in the field of research or scientific mediation including astronomy.

History 
In 1979, the City of Nantes decided to build a planetarium. At that time in France, there was only one large planetarium in at the Palais de la découverte and 3 small planetariums in Reims, ENAC Toulouse, and Marseille. The planetarium in Nantes was to be built on the upper part of Square Moisan, which was abandoned at this time.

Opened to the public on June 18, 1981, the planetarium is equipped with a Carl Zeiss projector, model ZKP2 identical to that of Reims, Nimes (which will open a year later) and Marseille (which will burn quickly).

Between 1999 and 2000, the City of Nantes expanded the premises with two offices of 9m2 (97 ft2), which allows to expand the lobby and install some models and collections of meteorites.

In the autumn of 2005, for approximately 480,000 euros, the opto-mechanical projector Zeiss was replaced by a digital type installation and the City of Nantes has offered its former planetary Zeiss at the National University of Córdoba (Argentina ). At that time, there were only 3 planetariums in France using Evans & Sutherland's Digistar II fisheye (Vaulx-en-Velin, Pleumeur-Bodou and Toulouse), and Saint-Étienne experimenting with multi-video projectors. Nantes is the first planetarium in the world to install five video projectors (to cover the entire vault) DLP type in a medium dome.

Since the 1990s, some pioneers have been developing digital installations to replace opto-mechanical star projectors. Digital installations consist of installing video projectors in the dome, computers and software (astronomical simulator) to reconstruct the observable Universe data astronomical catalogs constructed by data from astrometric satellites, such as Hipparcos (about 120,000 positioned stars) or Gaia (spacecraft) (more than 1 million objects). This makes it possible to move in a universe volume in three dimensions, in real time or to "travel" in time. If the simulator is well built, it can also travel from planets to planets and land there.

In the fall of 2013, the Nantes Planetarium closed for refurbishment work: change of video projectors, computers and software for around 500,000 euros. These two months of closure to the public have refreshed the chairs, redo the painting of the dome and re-arrange the lobby of the public.

As a result of the transformation of the urban community into Metropole, it becomes a metropolitan facility between January 2015 and January 2016.

Covid-19
Before this crisis, renovations were planned for fall 2020, but it did not go as planned. The Planetarium remained closed for 16 months. The initial works provided for the change of the carpet, the paintings, the renewal of the seats, the displacement of the console outside the perimeter of the room allowing the addition of eight new places, a new airlock allowing a discreet exit without flooding of light the spectators plunged into darkness. But the additional work made it possible to change the entire air conditioning system. The Planetarium reopened for its 40th anniversary on July 3, 2021.

Square Marcel-Moisan 
This small municipal square of  located between the back of the planetarium and the Rue de l'Hermitage, has in its center a set of sculptures, including a giant sundial, made by Jean-Michel Ansel, sundial maker, entitled  Structures astronomiques , representing the movement of the Earth around the Sun, eclipses of the Moon and the Sun, the retrograde movement of Mars, the sunshine of the Earth in real time, the planets scaled to each other etc. This square is accessible either by the staircase located between Misery street and Hermitage street, or from the Acadiens street bypassing the planetarium.

External links 
 Official website 
 Worldwide Planetariums Database (WPD)

Planetaria in France
Event venues established in 1981
Buildings and structures in Nantes
Tourist attractions in Nantes
Science museums in France